John Stuart Dowie AM (15 January 1915 – 19 March 2008) was an Australian painter, sculptor and teacher. He was born in the suburb of Prospect in Adelaide, South Australia, and studied architecture at the University of Adelaide, as well as painting with Ivor Hele and Marie Tuck. The painter Penny Dowie (1948–) is a niece.

During World War II, Dowie worked in the Military History Unit of the Australian Imperial Force, and as an assistant to Australia's official war sculptor, Lyndon Dadswell. As a soldier, he was one of the Rats of Tobruk.

After studying art in London and Florence, Dowie returned to Australia. His work includes over 50 public sculpture commissions, including the "Three Rivers" fountain in Victoria Square, "Alice" in Rymill Park, the "Victor Richardson Gates" at Adelaide Oval and the "Sir Ross & Sir Keith Smith Memorial" at Adelaide Airport. He was nominated for Senior Australian of the Year in 2005, and was made a Member of the Order of Australia in 1981 in recognition of service to the arts as a sculptor and painter.

Dowie died on 19 March 2008, aged 93, in an Adelaide nursing home, after having suffered a stroke the week before, and was buried in a country churchyard near Littlehampton, South Australia.

Bibliography
John Dowie: A Life in the Round, autobiography ed. Tracey Lock-Weir, Wakefield Press Adelaide

References

1915 births
2008 deaths
Members of the Order of Australia
Artists from Adelaide
Artists from South Australia
20th-century Australian sculptors
20th-century Australian painters
20th-century Australian male artists
Australian male painters
Australian Army personnel of World War II
People educated at Adelaide High School
Military personnel from South Australia